In taxonomy, Methanococcoides is a genus of the Methanosarcinaceae.

Methanococcoides species are methanogens entirely dependent on methylated compounds for nutrition.  The type species of Methanococcoides is Methanococcoides methylutens.

References

Further reading

Scientific journals

Scientific books

Scientific databases

External links

Archaea genera
Euryarchaeota